The Iraq babbler (Argya altirostris) is a species of bird in the family Leiothrichidae, native to reed beds of the Tigris-Euphrates Valley. It is found in Iraq and south-western Iran.

This species was formerly placed in the genus Turdoides but following the publication of a comprehensive molecular phylogenetic study in 2018, it was moved to the resurrected genus Argya.

References

Collar, N. J. & Robson, C. 2007. Family Timaliidae (Babblers)  pp. 70 – 291 in; del Hoyo, J., Elliott, A. & Christie, D.A. eds. Handbook of the Birds of the World, Vol. 12. Picathartes to Tits and Chickadees. Lynx Edicions, Barcelona.

Iraq babbler
Birds of the Middle East
Fauna of Iraq
Iraq babbler
Taxonomy articles created by Polbot